Decrene is a locality in Alberta, Canada. It is located northwest of the Hamlet of Smith and is sparsely inhabited.

Decrene was named for a railroad employee.

References 

Localities in the Municipal District of Lesser Slave River No. 124